Sherrie Lynn Hutchinson (born 17 September 1950) is an English actress, television personality and novelist. She is known for her roles as Maureen Holdsworth in Coronation Street (1993–1997, 2006), Virginia Raven in Crossroads (2001–2003), Lesley Meredith in Emmerdale (2004–2006) and Joyce Temple-Savage in Benidorm (2012–2018).

Hewson was also a main panellist on lunchtime chat show Loose Women (2003–2017) and came sixth place in Celebrity Big Brother in 2015. She has also appeared as Doreen Nesbitt (1979-1980) and Mary Henshaw in In Loving Memory (1984–1986) and as Jean in Barbara (1999–2003) on television, and has starred in the films Carry On Behind (1975), The Slipper and the Rose (1976) and Hanover Street (1979). Hewson has also written three books including a fiction book and a cookery book.

Early life 

Born in Beeston, near Nottingham, Hewson was brought up in a show-business family; her father Ronald was a singer and her mother Joy was a model. Hewson began attending the local dance and dramatics school at the age of three. She then attended Dorothy Grants High School for Girls in Beeston, although after the family had moved to a large manor house in Burton Joyce, Hewson completed her primary education at the village school. Aged twelve, Hewson was enrolled at The Rodney School, a boarding school in nearby Kirklington. Already a member of the Burton Joyce Players, Hewson attended the Midland Academy, studying drama and poetry, before she was granted a scholarship to attend the Royal Academy of Dramatic Art. While studying at RADA, Hewson shared a flat with fellow students Sharon Maughan and Louise Jameson.

Career 
Hewson made her screen debut in two episodes of Z Cars before appearing in The Moonstone and Within These Walls. In 1975, she joined the Carry On team for the film Carry On Behind and was subsequently cast in several episodes of the Carry On Laughing television series.

As well as further film roles in The Slipper and the Rose with Richard Chamberlain and Edith Evans and Hanover Street with Harrison Ford, Hewson became a regular fixture on television, most notably as part of a young cast of future stars in Love For Lydia. She also had a brief role in the 1979 Alan Bennett drama Afternoon Off as Iris, the ultimately unworthy object of the protagonist Lee's quest.

In the 1980s, as well as appearances in dramas such as Play for Today, The Sandbaggers, Minder, Juliet Bravo and The Gentle Touch, Hewson's talent for comedy saw her get invited to join Russ Abbot's Madhouse series, where she remained an integral part of his team for over ten years, later appearing in The Russ Abbot Show. Other comedy appearances included roles in Home to Roost, Home James!, Never the Twain and Haggard, while she was also a popular foil for various comedians, including Stanley Baxter, Les Dawson, Little and Large, Cannon and Ball and Les Dennis. Her most famous role during this period was as Mary Henshaw in the popular sitcom In Loving Memory with Thora Hird and Christopher Beeny.

In 1993, Hewson was cast as Maureen Webster in the UK's longest-running soap opera, Coronation Street, a dizzy, accident-prone supermarket assistant dominated by her mother. In 1996, Hewson was due to leave the show to film the first series of the BBC's Oh, Doctor Beeching!, reprising her role of May Skinner from the 1995 pilot. Although the part had been written with her in mind, Hewson agreed to sign a new contract at the request of the Coronation Street producers, who had storylines planned for her character, and Julia Deakin took over the role of May. However, in 1997, Coronation Street's new producer Brian Park axed a number of characters, including Maureen. Hewson's final episode was broadcast in October 1997. In December 2006, she returned as Maureen Webster for two episodes.

Hewson returned to the theatre – appearing in Billy Liar and several pantomimes – and radio, notably as the lead character in a series entitled The Circle. She was also in great demand for light entertainment programmes, and made appearances on Blankety Blank, Noel's House Party and Call My Bluff among others. In 1999, Hewson was cast as Jean in the sitcom Barbara.

In 2001, Hewson joined the cast of another soap opera, as receptionist Virginia Raven in the revival of Crossroads. In 2003, Hewson became a regular panellist on Loose Women, an ITV daytime programme. On 3 August 2016, Hewson announced her departure from the show, with her last episode being 5 September 2016. In 2004, Hewson appeared in a celebrity edition of makeover show 10 Years Younger and underwent cosmetic surgery to her face as well as a hair and fashion overhaul. She revealed that her decision to appear was partially influenced by the breakdown of her 20-year marriage to husband Ken Boyd. In 2004, Hewson joined the cast of Emmerdale as Lesley Meredith, mother of fishmonger Simon. She departed the show on 27 December 2006.  In 2007, Hewson made a number of non-acting television appearances. As well as Loose Women, she appeared in Celebrity MasterChef, Dickinson's Real Deal and was runner-up in Soapstar Superchef, partnered with her former Emmerdale co-star Julia Mallam. Hewson also appeared on a celebrity special of Who Wants to Be a Millionaire?.

In 2012, Hewson joined the cast of the sitcom Benidorm. Since its fifth series, she has appeared as Joyce Temple-Savage, the new manager of the Solana Hotel. On 18 January 2015, Hewson took part in celebrity talent show Get Your Act Together with plate spinner illusionist Andrew Van Buren. In August 2015, Hewson was a contestant in the sixteenth series of Channel 5 television show Celebrity Big Brother. She reached the final on Day 29, and finished in sixth place. In February 2016, Hewson won the role of Mrs. Slocombe in a remake of the BBC's 1970s and 1980s sitcom Are You Being Served?, taking over the part made famous by the late Mollie Sugden.  Only the pilot of this revival was made. In August 2016, Hewson announced that she was to leave Loose Women after 14 years. In 2018, she took part in ITV's 100 Years Younger in 21 Days.

Writing
In March 2008, Hewson won BBC reality show Murder Most Famous, winning the opportunity to write her own crime fiction novel, The Tannery, which was published on 5 March 2009 by Pan Macmillan as one of their 'quick reads', released annually as part of the World Book Day celebrations. In 2011, she released her autobiography entitled Sherrie: Behind The Laughter. On 13 February 2014, Hewson published a cookbook called Nana's Kitchen.

Personal life
After studying at RADA, Hewson dated and then lived with fellow student Robert Lindsay. The pair became engaged to be married, yet a few days before the wedding, Hewson discovered Lindsay was having an affair and cancelled it. Hewson also had one date with Steve McQueen; he urged Hewson to try some seafood which she did not like - after she vomited all over him, Hewson got a taxi home and never saw McQueen again.

In 1972, Hewson began a live-in relationship with John Rowlands, a banker, but he physically abused her. In her autobiography, Hewson detailed how Rowlands would "knock her from one side of the room to the other" while she "cowered in terror". Rowlands became both increasingly possessive and jealous of Hewson to the extent that when they went out to a bar, Rowlands followed her into the ladies toilets and started banging on the cubicle doors to get her out. Deciding to end the relationship as it was damaging her mental health, after Rowlands returned to their table, Hewson began making her way out of the bar when Rowlands came up behind her and hit her across the head with a cricket bat. The first blow knocked Hewson unconscious yet Rowlands continued to hit her with it until members of the public came to her aid. Although the police were called, Rowlands avoided trouble claiming it was a domestic argument. Although Hewson tried to distance herself from Rowlands, he would follow her around and give her "menacing" phone calls for several years afterwards.  

Hewson married the artist Hector Blamey; their marriage ended in divorce in 1974. In May 1983, Hewson married Ken Boyd, whom she had met in 1976, and had a daughter with him in 1984. The couple separated in 2001, after he admitted having an affair, and divorced in 2011.

In 2007, after over thirty years in show business, Hewson  declared bankruptcy. She described the experience as like having "a dreadful, contagious disease".

Hewson is a cousin of retired footballer Garry Birtles. Hewson's mother died in 2012.

Filmography

Film

Television

Theatre Credits

References

External links
 

1950 births
Living people
English writers
English film actresses
English television actresses
English soap opera actresses
Actors from Nottingham
English radio actresses
English stage actresses
Laurence Olivier Award winners
Alumni of RADA
English women novelists
People from Burton Joyce
Women autobiographers